Charles Louis Healy (born October 4, 1883, date of death unknown) was an American water polo player who competed in the 1904 Summer Olympics. He was born in Chicago. In the 1904 Olympics he won a silver medal as a member of Chicago Athletic Association water polo team.

References

External links
profile

1883 births
Year of death missing
American male water polo players
Olympic silver medalists for the United States in water polo
Water polo players at the 1904 Summer Olympics
Medalists at the 1904 Summer Olympics

ru:Водное поло на летних Олимпийских играх 1904#Составы команд